Buffalo '66 is a 1998 American crime comedy-drama film written and directed by Vincent Gallo, starring Gallo, Christina Ricci, Ben Gazzara and Anjelica Huston. The plot revolves around Billy Brown (Gallo), a man who kidnaps a young tap dancer named Layla (Ricci) and forces her to pretend to be his wife to impress his parents (Gazzara and Huston) after he gets released from prison.

The film was generally well-received; Empire listed it as the 36th-greatest independent film ever made. It was filmed in and around Gallo's hometown of Buffalo, New York, in winter. The film uses British progressive rock music in its soundtrack, notably King Crimson and Yes.

The title refers to the Buffalo Bills American football team, who had not won a championship since the 1965 American Football League Championship Game (which was actually played on December 28, 1965). The plot involves indirect references to the Bills' narrow loss to the New York Giants in Super Bowl XXV, which was decided by a missed field goal.

Plot
Having just served five years in prison, Billy Brown (Vincent Gallo) returns home to Buffalo, New York, and is preparing to meet with his parents, who don't know he's been in prison. He kidnaps Layla (Christina Ricci), a tap dancer, and forces her to pretend to be his wife to his parents. He gives her the name "Wendy Balsam".

When they meet with Billy's parents (Ben Gazzara and Anjelica Huston), Layla sees that the relationship between them is very dysfunctional, and sees Billy's own mother forgetting he has a chocolate allergy and his father behaves inappropriately towards her. She finds out that Billy's mother has never missed a Buffalo Bills game, except in 1966, on the day Billy was born. In a flashback it is revealed that Billy once placed a reckless $10,000 bet on the Bills to win Super Bowl XXV; when they lost, the bookie (Mickey Rourke) forced Billy to clear his debt by confessing to a crime he didn't commit, resulting in his time served in prison. Now Billy seeks revenge on Scott Wood, the kicker who lost the game. (This is a reference to Buffalo Bills kicker Scott Norwood, who missed the potential game-winning field goal in Super Bowl XXV.)

As they leave his parents' house, Billy scolds Layla for telling an obvious lie to his father, and then decides to go bowling. Here Billy shows off his expertise at the sport, and Layla gives a tap dance routine to King Crimson's 'Moonchild'. The two use a photo booth to take photos "spanning time" which Billy intends to send to his parents once a year, but Billy becomes annoyed when Layla makes silly faces during the photos, in contrast to Billy's straight face.

After bowling, Billy and Layla visit a diner, where Billy encounters the real Wendy Balsam (Rosanna Arquette), a girl he used to have a crush on in middle school, who is now happily in a relationship with another man. Billy leaves Layla alone in the diner after a brief argument, but regretting his outburst, returns and apologizes to her. Billy and Layla check into a motel, where Billy and Layla have a deep conversation, and eventually admit that they have fallen in love with each other, and they both go to sleep.

A few hours after midnight, he is about to leave to exact his revenge on Wood, when Layla awakens. Despite Layla's doubts that he'll return and proclamation of her love for him, he leaves, lying to her that he'll return in a few minutes with hot chocolate for her.

Shortly after leaving Layla at the motel, Billy finds Scott Wood, now the owner of a topless bar. At Wood's own bar, he walks over to Wood's table and shoots him in the head, before shooting himself. His parents are then shown sitting by his grave with his mother showing more interest in a Buffalo game on the radio than in her own son's death. However, this is all shown to be inside of Billy's mind. Billy leaves the bar without killing Wood, realizing that in Layla he's finally found a person who truly loves him. After making amends with his friend Goon (Kevin Corrigan) on a payphone, the film ends with Billy elatedly buying Layla her hot chocolate and a heart-shaped cookie, and buying another for a man sitting nearby who tells him he has a girlfriend, before returning to Layla at the motel.

Cast

Production
Gallo had difficulties working with his cast and crew, and reportedly did not get along with Ricci on set. Gallo called Ricci a "puppet" who did what she was told. Ricci vowed never to work with Gallo again. She also resented comments Gallo made about her weight three or four years after filming. Anjelica Huston also had issues with Gallo, and Gallo claimed Huston caused the film to be turned down by the Cannes Film Festival. After Gallo fired original cinematographer Dick Pope, director Stéphane Sednaoui suggested Lance Acord, though Gallo has claimed credit for designing most of the film's cinematography, citing Acord as a "button pusher" who had "never shot a feature film in his life". Gallo also publicly disparaged Acord, saying "This guy had no ideas, no conceptual ideas, no aesthetic point of view." Kevin Corrigan chose to opt out of the credits because he did not want to be associated with the film at the time.

Gallo was unable to use real NFL logos or to refer to the team as the "Buffalo Bills"—just "Buffalo" or "the Bills"—as NFL Properties was uncooperative. Kicker Scott Norwood was invited to participate in the film but declined, meaning Gallo had to change the character's name to Scott Wood.

The film was made for just under $2 million. It was filmed on reversal stock to give it a classic look similar to that of NFL Films reels from the 1960s, with high color saturation and contrast.

Music
Most of the film's score was composed and performed by Gallo himself; however, it also makes use of several other songs, including "Fools Rush In (Where Angels Fear to Tread)" by Nelson Riddle in a cover version performed by Gallo's father Vincent Gallo Sr., "Moonchild" by King Crimson, "I Remember When" by Stan Getz, and "Heart of the Sunrise" and "Sweetness" by Yes.

Reception
Review aggregator Rotten Tomatoes reports that 77% of critics have given the film a positive review based on 60 reviews with an average rating of 7.1/10. The critical consensus reads, "Self-indulgent yet intriguing, Buffalo '66 marks an auspicious feature debut for writer-director-star Vincent Gallo while showcasing a terrific performance from Christina Ricci". At Metacritic, it has a rating score of 68/100 based on 19 critics, indicating "generally favorable reviews". In Time Out New York, Andrew Johnston noted: "Ricci and Huston give poignant depth to characters that could have been cartoons, and Gallo makes Billy both annoying and sympathetic with seeming effortlessness. But the film's most potent ingredient is its visual style. The film's washed-out colors and the flashbacks that explode from Billy's head like comic-book thought balloons make Buffalo feel less like a movie than a dream given form."

Awards and nominations

In popular culture
 Dialogue from the film is sampled in reverse during the song "I'm Getting Closer" on M83 by the band M83.
 Swedish singer-songwriter Jens Lekman references Buffalo ‘66 in earlier recordings of his song “A Postcard to Nina”. In the plot of the song, he must pretend that he is Nina’s boyfriend during dinner with her parents.
 British band Wet Leg mention the film in their 2021 song "Wet Dream", in which a character propositions the singer with "Baby do you want to come home with me; I've got Buffalo '66 on DVD".

References

External links

 
 
 
 
 
  Entry for the film in the book New Cinematographers

1998 films
1990s crime comedy-drama films
1998 romantic comedy-drama films
American crime comedy-drama films
American independent films
American romantic comedy-drama films
Buffalo Bills
Lionsgate films
Films about dysfunctional families
American road comedy-drama films
1990s road comedy-drama films
Films directed by Vincent Gallo
Films set in Buffalo, New York
Films shot in Buffalo, New York
1998 independent films
1998 directorial debut films
1990s English-language films
Culture of Buffalo, New York
1990s American films